Betsy Heimann (sometimes credited as Betsy Faith Heimann) was born in Chicago, Illinois and is a costume designer in Hollywood.

Filmography
 Rush Hour 3 (2007)
 Lady in the Water (2006)
 Be Cool (2005)
 Red Dragon (2002)
 Vanilla Sky (2001)
 Almost Famous (2000)
 Out of Sight (1998)
 Jerry Maguire (1996)
 2 Days in the Valley (1996)
 Get Shorty (1995)
 Pulp Fiction (1994)
 Reservoir Dogs (1992)

External links
 
 Cinema.com bio page

Living people
Artists from Chicago
Year of birth missing (living people)